Arnfinn Larsen  (born 13 July 1930) is a Norwegian competition rower. He competed in the 1952 Summer Olympics.

References

External links

1930 births
Possibly living people
Sportspeople from Bærum
Norwegian male rowers
Olympic rowers of Norway
Rowers at the 1952 Summer Olympics